Orlovo Lake is an artificial lake in Petrovo, Republika Srpska, Bosnia and Herzegovina. It is located on Mount Ozren.

See also
List of lakes in Bosnia and Herzegovina

References

Lakes of Bosnia and Herzegovina